Huacheng Temple is the oldest and most prominent temple on Mount Jiuhua, Qingyang County, Anhui Province, China. It has a history of more than 1,500 years.

History

Jin dynasty
Huacheng Temple is the first temple and also the leading temple on Mount Jiuhua. It is said that in 401 CE during the Jin dynasty (266–420), an Indian monk Huaidu built a small Buddhist temple here.

Tang dynasty
During the Kaiyuan era of the Tang dynasty (618–907), a monk Tanhao was in charge and called it "Huacheng". In 781 CE, the governor of Chizhou, Zhang Yan, got approval from the central government, and moved the old board "Huacheng" to this temple. In 794 CE, Jin Qiaojue died at 99, and fellow monks regarded him as the incarnation of the Bodhisattva Ksitigarbha. Ever since Huacheng Temple was dedicated to Ksitigarbha.

Song dynasty
In the late Southern Song dynasty (1127–1279), the abbot was Guangzong, later called Guangchuan monk.

Yuan dynasty
In 1321 during the Yuan dynasty (1271–1368), the abbot was Zhenguan, later called Wuxiang monk.

Ming dynasty
In 1391 during the Ming dynasty (1368–1644), the abbots Zongling and Fajian expanded it to a Chan Buddhist temple. In 1435, monk Fuqing of Linggu Temple in Nanjing moved to Mount Jiuhua to preside over Huacheng Temple due to his old age. He rebuilt Grand Hall of the Great Sage, Cangjing, Zushi, Jingang, Tianwang and Jialan Halls, and also expanded Eastern Halls. In the Zhengtong era of the Ming dynasty, the abbots Daotai, and later Dugang, Fayan, Faguang expanded Foge, Fangzhang, Langwu, Dizang Hall and Shijie, forming Western Halls. In 1569, businessman Huang Longding of Anhui donated to rebuild the temple. In 1603, the abbot Liangyuan went to Beijing and the central government bestowed purple kasaya on him.

Qing dynasty
In 1681 during the Qing dynasty (1644–1911), the governor of Chizhou, Yu Chenglong, renovated the temple and built "Juhua Pavilion". The temple comprised Eastern and Western Palaces and totaled 72 halls. Thus, Huacheng Temple became the leading temple in Mount Jiuhua, called General Buddhist Temple. From 1703–1705, the Kangxi Emperor ordered his close servant to come to Mount Jiuhua to worship the temple three times, making donations and bestowing a board "Superior Place of Jiuhua". In 1766, it received another board written by the emperor, "Fragrant Grand Temple". However, in 1857, the temple was destroyed, and only Sutra Library was left. In 1890, the abbot Lunfa and pilgrim Liu Hanfang and others donated to rebuild four halls.

Republic of China
In 1926, Shi Rongxu founded "Jiangnan Mount Jiuhua Buddhist Academy" here.

People's Republic of China
The government of Qinyang County renovated the temple in 1955. But in 1968, all the Buddhist images were destroyed. In 1981, the temple was rebuilt, and Mount Jiuhua Historical and Cultural Museum was opened. The preserved collection of more than 1,800 pieces was on exhibition. The temple has a land area of 3,500 square meters. On 8 September 1981, the government of Anhui claimed Huacheng Temple as a key conserved location of historical relics. In 1983, the state council honored Huacheng Temple as national key Buddhist temple in Han area.

Art
Mount Jiuhua has always attracted creative minds; poets and artists have visited here. As a result, there has been a rich legacy of art in the Huacheng Temple. Great artists, poets, and playwrights such as Li Bai, Liu Yuxi, Du Mu, Mei Yaochen, Wang Anshi, Wen Tianxiang, Tang Xianzu and Zhang Daqian have come to the mountain. Their calligraphic works and paintings survive to this day and are now housed in the Jiuhua Museum of Buddhist Relics.

Architecture
Huacheng Temple located at the foot of Mount Furong. It is the main and first temple of Jiuhua Mountains as well as bodhimanda of Kṣitigarbha. Now the existing halls and rooms were built in the Qing dynasty (1644–1911), the main buildings include Lingguan Hall, Four Heavenly Kings Hall, Mahavira Hall and Buddhist Texts Library.

Mahavira Hall
He stands on the base platform made of white marble. He drops his hands naturally with palms outward, meaning to realize wishes of all living creatures.

Right above of hall, there are three big and small caissons which were made in 1889 during the reign of Guangxu Emperor (1875–1908) in the Qing dynasty (1644–1911). The eight corners of the big caisson are carved with eight Chinese dragons, which plus another Chinese dragon on the top of the caisson and the flame pearl from the pattern of "Nine Dragons Playing with a Ball". The small caissons are on both sides of the big caisson.

Buddhist Texts Library
The hall stores the well-preserved Nirvana Sutra and Avatamsaka Sutra written by monk Wuxia with his own blood in the Ming dynasty (1368–1644).

National Treasure
It was cast between 1875 and 1908 during the Guangxu period (1875–1908) of the Qing dynasty (1644–1911). At the beginning of the Chinese New Year, the bell is rung 108 times to represent 12 months, 24 solar terms and 72 hou (Hou is an ancient Chinese seasonal divider, every 3 hou comes a Chinese seasonal divider), which signifies peace, good fortune and prevention of evils and bad luck for the year.

References

Bibliography
 
 

Buddhist temples on Mount Jiuhua
Buildings and structures in Chizhou
Tourist attractions in Chizhou
1926 establishments in China
5th-century Buddhist temples
Religious buildings and structures completed in 1981